Hypocysta angustata, the black and white ringlet or pied ringlet, is a species of butterfly of the family Nymphalidae. It is found on the Cape York Peninsula in Australia and in the rainforests of New Guinea.

The wingspan is about 30 mm. Adults have black forewings with a white patch. The hindwings are white with a black border and a pair of eyespots. The underside of the wings is similar, but there are three eyespots on the hindwings.

The larvae feed on various Poaceae species, including Tetrarrhena species. They are dark green with a forked tail and a brown head with orange horns. Full-grown larvae are about 15 mm long. Pupation takes place in a brown pupa with dark markings which is attached to the food plant.

References

Satyrini
Butterflies described in 1914